Lull is a dark ambient project of former Napalm Death drummer Mick Harris, which he founded in 1990.

History
Mick Harris began the project Lull in 1990, when he acquired a sampler, a reverb pedal and a 4-track recorder. After leaving the grindcore band Napalm Death, Harris wanted to create dark ambient music. Aaron Turner of Isis and Mamiffer described the Lull album Way through Staring as "the first really minimal music I encountered that really captivated me".

Discography

Studio Albums 
 1992 - Dreamt About Dreaming
 1993 - Journey Through Underworlds
 1994 - Cold Summer
 1996 - Continue
 1997 - Way Through Staring
 1998 - Moments
 2001 - Brook (with Origami Arktika)
 2008 - Like a Slow River
 2022 - That Space Somewhere

EPs 
 1994 - Chime / Gerbarra
 1994 - Silenced / Outerbounds
 1994 - Echoed Currents / Shooting Star Crash
 1994 - The Passing / Iceberg
 1995 - Time Box
 2008 - Circadian Rhythm Disturbance (with Beta Cloud)

Compilation Albums 
 2003 - Collected (Rare and Unreleased tracks)

See also 
List of ambient music artists
List of dark ambient artists

References 

English electronic music groups
Musical groups from Birmingham, West Midlands
Musical groups established in 1991
Dark ambient music groups